Vlada Ginga (born 22 April 2001) is a Moldovan badminton player. She was part of the first generation of Moldovan badminton player to compete at the World Junior Championships. She won her first junior international title at the 2017 Slovak Junior International in the girls' doubles event partnered with Petra Polanc. She competed at the 2018 Summer Youth Olympics and 2019 European Games.

Achievements

BWF International Challenge/Series (1 runner-up) 
Women's singles

  BWF International Challenge tournament
  BWF International Series tournament
  BWF Future Series tournament

BWF Junior International 
Girls' doubles

  BWF Junior International Grand Prix tournament
  BWF Junior International Challenge tournament
  BWF Junior International Series tournament
  BWF Junior Future Series tournament

References

External links 
 

2001 births
Living people
Sportspeople from Chișinău
Moldovan female badminton players
Badminton players at the 2018 Summer Youth Olympics
Badminton players at the 2019 European Games
European Games competitors for Moldova